Great Neck Saw is an American company that manufactures and distributes hand tools, including wrenches, screwdrivers, hammers, chisels, and automotive specialty tools. The company is the largest privately owned tool manufacturer in the United States.

The company sells tools under the Great Neck, Sheffield, OEM, GreatLite, Mayes, and Buck Bros. brand names, as well as private label brands such as Husky and Kobalt.

History 

In 1919, Samuel Jacoff started a business in Pittsfield, Massachusetts manufacturing hacksaw blades. In 1929, he merged his business with Great Neck Manufacturing, another blade manufacturer. In 1941, the company moved to its current location of Mineola, New York.

Gallery

References

External links 
 

American brands
Tool manufacturing companies of the United States
Manufacturing companies established in 1919
Companies based in Nassau County, New York
1919 establishments in Massachusetts